Van Aitzema is a surname of West Frisian origin. Notable people named van Aitzema include the following:

Foppe van Aitzema (1580—1637), council to the Duke of Brunswick
Lieuwe van Aitzema (1600—1669), Dutch historian, diplomat, bon-vivant, philanderer and spy

Aitzema, van
Surnames of Dutch origin